The 7th Trampoline World Championships were held in Stuttgart, West Germany on 23 September 1972.

Results

Men

Trampoline

Trampoline Synchro

Women

Trampoline

Trampoline Synchro

References
 Trampoline UK

Trampoline World Championships
Trampoline Gymnastics World Championships
Trampoline World Championships
International gymnastics competitions hosted by West Germany
Trampoline World Championships